"Jumpin', Jumpin'" is a song by American group Destiny's Child for their second studio album, The Writing's on the Wall (1999). The song was co-written and co-produced by group member Beyoncé Knowles and Chad Elliott, with additional writing from Rufus Moore and production assistance from Jovonn Alexander. It was released as the fourth and final single from The Writing's on the Wall on July 14, 2000, by Columbia Records.

"Jumpin', Jumpin'" became a commercial success, peaking at number three on the US Billboard Hot 100 and within the top ten in Australia, Canada, Iceland, the Netherlands, New Zealand, and the United Kingdom. Critically acclaimed, the song was ranked at number 232 on Pitchfork's "Top 500 Songs of the 2000s".

Composition
Musically, "Jumpin', Jumpin'" is an up-beat pop and R&B styled dance track with influences of melodic rap.  During the duration of the record, Knowles sings in rap-like style, something she is notable for doing in Destiny's Child as well later on in her solo career. It is performed in the key of C minor with a tempo of 89 beats per minute. Meanwhile, the song's chords alternate between Cm and G, while the vocals span one and a half octaves, from D3 to G4.

Commercial performance
"Jumpin', Jumpin'" peaked at number three on the US Billboard Hot 100 on August 19, 2000, becoming Destiny's Child's fourth top-ten hit, and remained at the position for five non-consecutive weeks. The song peaked at number one on the Hot 100 Airplay for seven consecutive weeks, becoming one of the biggest radio hits of 2000 and the group's second longest run atop the chart behind "Independent Women Part I", which reigned for nine consecutive weeks. Though the song did not reach number one on the Billboard Hot 100, it spent 16 weeks within the top ten, longer than both previous number-one hits "Bills, Bills, Bills" and "Say My Name", as well as any of the songs that prevented it from reaching the top of the chart.

In the United Kingdom, "Jumpin', Jumpin'" was a top-five hit and sold over 195,000 copies. It also achieved success when it charted at number two in Australia. In the Netherlands, "Jumpin', Jumpin'" peaked at number ten on the Dutch Single Top 100, spending a total of 14 weeks on the chart.

Music video
The video for "Jumpin', Jumpin'" was directed by Joseph Kahn, who previously worked with the group on the video for "Say My Name".

The video starts with a timelapse of a city to from day to night while cutting into close-up shots of the group members putting on lipstick and nail-polish. Destiny's Child are at home, getting prepared and dressed up for a night out at the club. Kelly Rowland is seen sitting on a couch while Farrah Franklin is seen getting her dress zipped up by Michelle Williams. There's also scenes of guys getting ready to go to the club, with one being a first-person view of someone shaving their face. Throughout the video, the camera moves in a shaky manner, like if it was jumping. After the first chorus, the group get into a car with Beyoncé behind the wheel and drive to their destination. They pass a group of guys in a car, who pull a u-turn and follow them until they meet them at a red-light. They challenge them to a car race in which Destiny's Child ultimately win. They arrive at the club during the "bounce" interlude and perform choreography with the camera moving as the song lyrics say. During this part, there's also a fisheye lens effect where Beyoncé is seen getting down close to. The video ends with the group dancing with other people on the dance floor.

It premiered on music video stations such as BET, MTV, and VH1 on the week ending June 12, 2000. This was the final music video to feature Farrah Franklin. The original music video was never released to a video compilation nor to an enhanced CD, whereas the "So So Def Remix" is available on the video compilation The Platinum's on the Wall.

Remixes
Two official urban remixes for this song exist. The Nitro remix features rapper Mr. Nitro and the So So Def remix features Lil' Bow Wow, Da Brat, and Jermaine Dupri; a music video was filmed for the latter.

The "Azza's Remix" of "Jumpin', Jumpin'" contains newly recorded vocals. Along with the WNBA version that was made to promote the 2000 WNBA All-Star Game, these versions are the only songs from The Writing's on the Wall that feature Farrah Franklin and Michelle Williams.

Track listings

US and Canadian maxi-CD single
 "Jumpin', Jumpin'" (album version) – 3:47
 "Jumpin', Jumpin'" (So So Def remix clean version featuring Jermaine Dupri, Da Brat, and Lil Bow Wow) – 3:45
 "Jumpin', Jumpin'" (Maurice's Jumpin' Retro Mix) – 8:20
 "Jumpin', Jumpin'" (Azza's remix) – 5:15
 "Upside Down" (live from "VH1 Divas 2000: A Tribute to Diana Ross") – 4:09

US 2×12-inch single
A1. "Jumpin', Jumpin'" (Maurice's Jumpin' Retro Mix) – 8:20
A2. "Jumpin', Jumpin'" (Azza's remix) – 5:15
B1. "Jumpin', Jumpin'" (Digital Black N Groove club mix) – 7:50
B2. "Upside Down" (live from "VH1 Divas 2000: A Tribute to Diana Ross") – 4:09
C1. "Jumpin', Jumpin'" (album version) – 3:47
C2. "Jumpin', Jumpin'" (So So Def remix clean version featuring Jermaine Dupri, Da Brat, and Lil Bow Wow) – 3:45
C3. "Jumpin', Jumpin'" (remix featuring Mr. Nitro) – 4:26
C4. "Jumpin', Jumpin'" (album version instrumental) – 3:47
D1. "Jumpin', Jumpin'" (So So Def remix instrumental) – 3:45
D2. "Jumpin', Jumpin'" (remix featuring Mr. Nitro instrumental) – 4:26
D3. "Jumpin', Jumpin'" (album version a cappella) – 3:47
D4. "Jumpin', Jumpin'" (So So Def remix a cappella) – 3:40

Australian and New Zealand CD single
 "Jumpin', Jumpin'"
 "Say My Name" (Timbaland remix)
 "Say My Name" (Maurice's Last Days of Disco Millennium Mix)
 "Say My Name" (Daddy D remix with rap)
 "Say My Name" (Digital Black & Groove Club Mix)

UK CD1
 "Jumpin', Jumpin'" (album version) – 3:47
 "Jumpin', Jumpin'" (Azza's remix) – 5:15
 "Upside Down" (live from "VH1 Divas 2000: A Tribute to Diana Ross") – 4:09

UK CD2
 "Jumpin', Jumpin'" (Maurice's radio mix) – 4:05
 "Say My Name" (Maurice's Last Days of Disco Millennium Mix) – 7:35
 "Bills, Bills, Bills" (Maurice's Xclusive Livegig Mix) – 7:33

UK cassette single
 "Jumpin', Jumpin'" (album version) – 3:47
 "Jumpin', Jumpin'" (So So Def remix clean version featuring Jermaine Dupri, Da Brat, and Lil Bow Wow) – 3:45

European CD1
 "Jumpin', Jumpin'" (album version) – 3:47
 "Upside Down" (live from "VH1 Divas 2000: A Tribute to Diana Ross") – 4:09

European CD2
 "Jumpin', Jumpin'" (album version) – 3:47
 "Jumpin', Jumpin'" (So So Def remix clean version featuring Jermaine Dupri, Da Brat, and Lil Bow Wow) – 3:45
 "Upside Down" (live from "VH1 Divas 2000: A Tribute to Diana Ross") – 4:09
 "Jumpin', Jumpin'" (Maurice's radio mix) – 4:05

Credits and personnel
Credits are taken from The Writing's on the Wall album booklet.

Studios
 Recorded at 353 Studio (New York City) and 24/7 Studio (Houston, Texas)
 Mixed at Sony Studios (New York City)

Personnel

 Rufus Moore – writing
 Chad Elliott – writing, production, mixing
 Beyoncé Knowles – writing, production
 Byron Rittenhouse – male voice
 Jovonn Alexander – production
 David Donaldson – engineering
 Andre DeBourg – engineering
 Charles Alexander – engineering

Charts

Weekly charts

Year-end charts

Certifications

Release history

See also
 List of Billboard Mainstream Top 40 number-one songs of 2000
 List of UK R&B Singles Chart number ones of 2000

References

1999 songs
2000 singles
Columbia Records singles
Destiny's Child songs
Music videos directed by Joseph Kahn
Song recordings produced by Beyoncé
Songs written by Beyoncé